Ware F.C. is a football club established in 1892 and based at Wodson Park in Ware, Hertfordshire, England, currently members of the .

History
The club was founded in 1892 and although first called Ware Town soon changed its name to plain Ware FC.  The club has held senior status from its very beginning, entering the Herts Senior Cup for the first time in 1893, and winning the cup on the first of five occasions in 1899 with a 2–1 win over Hitchin at St Albans. By this time Ware had been instrumental in founding the East Herts League and had won its championship on two of the three times it had been competed for. The club was to win it five more times before moving on to the North Middlesex League in 1907 and then also to the Herts County League in 1908. The championship of the latter came that season in a three-way play off against St Albans City and Welwyn.

After the First World War the club gained a league and cup double with a second Herts County League Championship and a fourth Herts Senior Cup win in 1922. The scenes in Ware when the team returned with the Senior Cup tell us something about the hold that football had on local loyalties at the time. The local paper reported that "Large crowds awaited the return of the special train to Ware, everybody being in high spirits. The Cup was marched through the town in front of a cheering throng." Indeed, it was later recalled that the cup was taken through the town on subsequent nights and that stops were made outside public houses where it was charged with beer before being drained by the crowd.

Shortly after this Ware joined the Spartan League in which they were to enjoy several successes, winning the Division 2(B) Championship in 1926, Division 1 in 1951 with the highest "goals for" total ever achieved by a club in the Spartan League, and the Premier Division in 1952. In these later years the club also made significant progress in the old Amateur Cup meeting many famous sides on the way. One of these was Hendon, against whom Ware drew their largest attendance of 3,800 in the first round in January 1957.

Moving on to the Delphian League and then Athenian League, Ware enjoyed another successful period. Two promotions, two league cup wins and two reserve championships paved the way for progress in the FA Cup. In this Ware reached the first round proper for the first time in 1968 when they travelled to the then Third Division side Luton Town. The opposition had a 100% home record but the game was scoreless with 30 minutes to go before a judicious substitution broke the stalemate and left Ware beaten 6–1 at the final whistle.

In these successful circumstances it was not surprising that Ware pressed for entry to the expanding Isthmian League. This was achieved for season 1975–76 and they have maintained their place in the league ever since. This is thanks most recently to their Division 2 championship season of 2005–06 which carried them into Division 1 just before Division 2 was disbanded. Another FA Cup first round appearance in 2007 has added further distinction with a narrow home defeat against Kidderminster Harriers being watched by 2,123 people, a record for the current ground at Wodson Park.

Before that a tenth Herts Senior Cup final in 2001 and another in 2008 have emphasised the club's long history and continuity. Ware is the first of only three possible candidates to appear in this final in three separate centuries.

Ahead of the 2015–16 season, following Clevedon Town's demotion from the Southern Football League, Ware were transferred from the Isthmian League Division One North to the Southern League Division One Central but following further reorganisation by the FA Leagues Committee, 2016–17 saw them return to the Isthmian League.

Following the addition of a further division at Step 4 level of the National League System and the consequent reallocation of clubs, Ware returned to the Southern League ahead of season 2021/2.

Honours
Isthmian League
Division Two champions 2005–06
Spartan League
Premier Division champions 1952–53
Division One champions 1951–52
Division Two (B) champions 1926–27
Herts County League
Champions 1908–09, 1921–22
East Herts League
Champions 1897–98, 1898–99, 1899–1900, 1902–03, 1903–04, 1905–06 (shared), 1906–07
Herts Senior Cup
 Winners 1898–99, 1903–04, 1906–07, 1921–22, 1953–54
Herts Charity Shield
 Winners 1926–27, 1952–53, 1956–57, 1958–59, 1962–63, 1985–86
East Anglian Cup
 Winners 1973–74

Records
FA Cup best performance: first round proper – 1968–69, 2007–08
FA Amateur Cup best performance: second round proper – 1953–54, 1954–55
FA Trophy best performance: third qualifying round – 1979–80
FA Vase best performance: fourth round – 2002–03
FA Youth Cup best performance: second round proper – 2019-20
Record attendance: 3,800 vs Hendon, FA Amateur Cup, January 1957
Biggest victory: 10–1 vs Wood Green Town
Heaviest defeat: 0–11 vs Barnet
Most appearances: Gary Riddle, 654

Former players
1. Players that have played/managed in the Football League or any foreign equivalent to this level (i.e. fully professional league).
2. Players with full international caps.
3. Players that hold a club record or have captained the club.
 Warren Gravette
 Carlos Simeon
 Marvin Hamilton
 Micah Hyde
 Ryan Maxwell
 Scott Neilson
 Derek Saunders

References

Sources

 An Intention to Play – The History of Ware Football Club 1892–1992

External links
Official Website
Old Website

Football clubs in England
Isthmian League
1892 establishments in England
Association football clubs established in 1892
Delphian League
Athenian League
Football clubs in Hertfordshire
Ware, Hertfordshire
Southern Football League clubs
Wareside